Daniel bar Maryam (or Mariam) was a historian and chronographer of the Church of the East who lived in the 7th century.

Daniel is known to have been a contemporary of the Patriarch Ishoʿyahb III. He may be the same person as Daniel bar Ṭubanitha.

Daniel wrote a four-volume Ecclesiastical History in Syriac that does not survive, but is mentioned by the Patriarch Timothy I, Pseudo-George of Arbela and Ishoʿdad of Merv. It is cited or quoted five times in the Arabic Chronicle of Siirt, but whether it was used directly may be doubted. It is one of three lost 7th-century histories that the anonymous author of the Chronicle appears to have had access to, along with those of Elias of Merv and Bar Sahde. According to Daniel, as cited by the Chronicle, the Patriarch Ahha wrote the biography of his master, the Life of ʿAbda of Deir Qoni, during his patriarchate. He is also cited in a passage on Demetrianus of Antioch. Philip Wood, however, doubts that Daniel is the main source for these passages. Daniel is quoted on the successors of Demetrianus: a certain Azdaq in Gundeshapur and Paul of Samosata at Antioch.

According to ʿAbdishoʿ bar Brikha's list of Syriac authors, composed in the 14th century, Daniel also wrote an exposition of the Chronicon of Eusebius.

Notes

Bibliography

7th-century historians
Syriac writers
Church of the East writers